William Dean "Bill" Borders (March 3, 1930 – January 27, 2022) was an American wrestler. Borders and other members of the wrestling team did not participate in the opening ceremonies because tryouts were still in progress.

In the  finals at the 1951 NCAA championships, Borders lost to Tony Gizoni of Waynesburg University in the championship match, though the Sooners still won the team title by one point over in-state rival Oklahoma State.

During the 1952 Summer Olympics in Helsinki, Borders won his first match against Swiss wrestler Paul Hänni before losing to Mohamed Mehdi Yaghoubi of Iran in the second round and eventual silver medalist Rashid Mammadbeyov in the third round. Borders later said in an interview, "We really didn't know that much about the international rules when we went over there... For instance, I was good at takedowns, but you didn't get any points for takedowns or escapes. You only got points for exposing your opponent's back to the mat. So, we had to adjust our style to the international style."

Borders did not begin wrestling until his freshman year at Webster High School, taking advice from his gym coach to join the team. He began to take the sport seriously upon learning from a teammate that colleges gave scholarships to top wrestlers, ultimately earning a spot in the Oklahoma Sooners wrestling program coached by Port Robertson. Borders went on to practice law in Tulsa, Oklahoma.

References

External links
 

1930 births
2022 deaths
American male sport wrestlers
Olympic wrestlers of the United States
Wrestlers at the 1952 Summer Olympics
Sportspeople from Tulsa, Oklahoma